Klimt is a 2006 Austrian art-house biographical film about the life of the Austrian Symbolist painter Gustav Klimt (1862–1918). It was written and directed by Chilean filmmaker Raúl Ruiz, with an English screenplay adaptation by Gilbert Adair. The director of photography was Ricardo Aronovich, and the music was composed by Jorge Arriagada. The title role is played by John Malkovich and the cast includes Stephen Dillane. Both  a 130-minute-long director's cut and a shortened producer's cut of 96 minutes  were shown at the 2006 Berlin Film Festival.
A few months later the film was shown at the 28th Moscow International Film Festival where it was nominated for two awards, winning the Russian Film Clubs Federation Award.

Plot
This art house film is presented in the format of a sequence of nearly two dozen often disassociated vignettes taken from the life of Gustav Klimt and visualized by him in his recollection. All of this occurs while he is being treated late in life in hospital using mercury treatments for advanced syphilis which he had contracted earlier in his life. In his advanced age, Klimt has become a leading artist in Vienna and his work is celebrated at all level of society in Austria.

Throughout his life, Klimt has had a special interest in the depiction of the beauty he associates with the female form and his studio is constantly occupied by nude models posing for his drawings and oil paintings. Klimt is open minded as to the expression of his own sexuality and casually forms relationships of an intimate nature with many of his models. A number of his models bear his children, and Klimt's visualized recollections of his younger years showing him as being aware of having fathered many children, some of whose identities he knows and some of which are nearly anonymous to him. In one visit to a local brothel with a male acquaintance, an older Klimt is introduced to one of the prostitutes as actually being his daughter, fathered during his visits to the brothel as a younger man. When his acquaintance asks him if this is true, Klimt casually says he does not know and the two men continue their evening of indulgence.

A recurrent figure in the visualized vignettes which Klimt experiences while receiving mercury treatment in hospital, is an unnamed government official who seems to obtain commissions from the Ministry of Culture for Klimt. When a three panel order is made for three large canvases, Klimt paints them and they are displayed with a large government reception. The reception is mixed as to the assessment of the quality of the works of art, though Klimt is accepted as an artist of stature to be respected by both higher and lower officials. During the vignettes, his fellow Austrian artist Egon Schiele also visits Klimt at various points in his life during Klimt's visualized segments of his life while his mercury treatment is continued.

Klimt's two main love affairs are with his friend from Austria, Emilie Floege, and an actress, Lea de Castro, from Paris, both of whom he often depicts in his art works. He is strongly attracted to both models for their presentation of the beauty of the female form and at one point even proposes marriage to his favorite Emilie so long as the marriage be an open marriage. In one of the vignettes, Klimt is pictured with his mother and sister, both of whom are under care in an asylum for the mentally ill, and they confront him with questions about the illegitimate children he is rumored to have fathered. Klimt again states that he does not know how many children he has fathered or the general whereabouts of his progeny. As Klimt reaches the final stages of his mercury treatment, he expires during the treatment, his last recollections being about the beauty of his art rather than any of the moral ascriptions made concerning his lifetime which all appear to have been secondary to him in comparison to the importance he associated with his career as an artist.

Cast
 John Malkovich as Gustav Klimt
 Veronica Ferres as Emilie "Midi" Floege
 Stephen Dillane as Secretary
 Saffron Burrows as Lea de Castro (based on Cléo de Mérode)
 Sandra Ceccarelli as Serena Lederer
 Nikolai Kinski as Egon Schiele
 Aglaia Szyszkowitz as Mizzi
 Joachim Bißmeier as Hugo Moritz
 Ernst Stötzner as Minister Hartl
 Paul Hilton as Duke Octave
 Annemarie Düringer as Anna Finster Klimt
 Irina Wanka as Berta Zuckerkandl
 Klaus Ofczarek as Old Waiter

Critical response
Philip French, in The Observer described the film as calculatedly enigmatic. Cosmo Landesman, in The Sunday Times, described the film as "frigid and silly" being unnecessarily difficult to follow in the style of Stanley Kubrick's Eyes Wide Shut.

On review aggregation website Rotten Tomatoes, Klimt holds an approval rating of 32% based on 25 reviews, with an average rating of 5.04/10. The site's critical consensus reads, "Klimt is handsomely filmed, but the blurred storyline and substandard performances prove its undoing." On Metacritic, the film has a weighted average score of 44 out of 100, based on 7 critics, indicating "mixed or average reviews".

Further reading 
 Stewart, Janet (2017); "Filming Vienna 1900: The poetics of cinema and the politics of ornament in Raúl Ruiz's Klimt" in Ignacio López-Vicuña, Andreea Marinescu (eds.) Raúl Ruiz's Cinema of Inquiry, Wayne State University Press, pp. 118–144.

References

External links
 

2006 films
2000s French-language films
2000s German-language films
2000s psychological drama films
Biographical films about painters
Films about schizophrenia
Films about syphilis
Films directed by Raúl Ruiz
Films set in the 19th century
Films set in the 1900s
Films set in the 1910s
Films set in Vienna
Films shot in Cologne
Films shot in Vienna
Austrian biographical drama films
British biographical drama films
French biographical drama films
German biographical drama films
English-language Austrian films
English-language French films
English-language German films
Gustav Klimt
2006 drama films
2000s British films
2000s French films
2000s German films